Russell S. Decker (born May 25, 1953) is an American home construction contractor and former Democratic politician.  He served 20 years in the Wisconsin State Senate (1991–2011) and was majority leader from October 2007 through December 2010.

Biography

Born in Athens, Wisconsin, Decker graduated from Athens High School, afterward attending Northcentral Technical College in Wausau, Wisconsin as an apprentice bricklayer. He now lives in Schofield, Wisconsin.

Decker was first elected to the Senate in 1990. The day after passage of the 2007-2008 state budget, the Senate Democratic Caucus elected Decker to replace Judy Robson as Majority Leader.

DUI 
In April 2005, Decker was arrested and charged with OWI. He pleaded guilty to the lesser charge of driving with a prohibited blood alcohol content and had to give up his driver's license for six months.

On November 2, 2010, Republican Pam Galloway defeated Decker in his reelection bid.  In the lame duck session after losing re-election, Decker cast a deciding vote not to ratify new state employee contracts, and as a result was stripped of his leadership position by a vote of his caucus.

Committee assignments
 Committee on Senate Organization (Chair)
 Joint Committee on Legislative Organization
 Joint Survey Committee on Tax Exemptions
 Joint Committee on Employment Relations
 Joint Legislative Council

References

External links

Follow the Money - Russ Decker
2010 2008 2006 2004 2002 2000 1998 campaign contributions

1953 births
Living people
People from Athens, Wisconsin
Northcentral Technical College alumni
Democratic Party Wisconsin state senators
Wisconsin politicians convicted of crimes
21st-century American politicians
People from Schofield, Wisconsin